Zarechye is a rural locality (a khutor) in Rusanovsky Selsoviet Rural Settlement, Fatezhsky District, Kursk Oblast, Russia. Population:

Geography 
The khutor is located on the Usozha River (a left tributary of the Svapa in the basin of the Seym), 100 km from the Russia–Ukraine border, 46 km north-west of Kursk, 3.5 km west of the district center – the town Fatezh, 2 km from the selsoviet center – Basovka.

 Climate
Zarechye has a warm-summer humid continental climate (Dfb in the Köppen climate classification).

Transport 
Zarechye is located 1 km from the federal route  Crimea Highway as part of the European route E105, 2 km from the road of regional importance  (Fatezh – Dmitriyev), 1.5 km from the road of intermunicipal significance  (M2 "Crimea Highway" – Chibisovka), 31.5 km from the nearest railway halt 29 km (railway line Arbuzovo – Luzhki-Orlovskiye).

The rural locality is situated 49 km from Kursk Vostochny Airport, 167 km from Belgorod International Airport and 237 km from Voronezh Peter the Great Airport.

References

Notes

Sources

Rural localities in Fatezhsky District